The following is a list of unproduced Martin Scorsese projects in roughly chronological order. During his long career, American film director Martin Scorsese has worked on a number of projects which never progressed beyond the pre-production stage under his direction. Some of these productions fell in development hell or were cancelled.

20th century

Jesus in New York
Scorsese said that in the 1960s, he had an idea for a movie about Jesus but set in the Lower East Side. The film was to have been shot in black and white with the crucifixion filmed on the West Side docks.

Do Androids Dream of Electric Sheep? 
According to Philip K. Dick, Scorsese and screenwriter Jay Cocks expressed interest in adapting his novel Do Androids Dream of Electric Sheep? in the early 1970s but never optioned it. The novel would later be adapted by Ridley Scott, as the film Blade Runner.

The Honeymoon Killers
Scorsese was attached as director during the first weeks of production on the 1970 film The Honeymoon Killers.

Bury My Heart at Wounded Knee
In the 1970s, Scorsese attempted to direct a film adaptation of Bury My Heart at Wounded Knee with Marlon Brando slated to star.

Theodora and Justinian
In the early 1990s, Scorsese was to direct a movie about Theodora and Justinian for Universal Pictures with the screenplay written by Gore Vidal.

Dino
In 1992, Scorsese acquired the film adaptation rights to Nick Tosches's biography about Dean Martin titled Dino.  Scorsese had Tom Hanks in mind to portray Martin.  The screenplay was written by Nicholas Pileggi.  In 2004, Scorsese confirmed that he gave up on the project.

Gershwin
In August 1993, it was reported that Scorsese was to direct a biopic about the life of composer George Gershwin with Robert De Niro and Richard Dreyfuss attached to star and the screenplay written by John Guare.

21st century

Sinatra 
Throughout the 2000s Scorsese developed a biopic of Frank Sinatra, originally to star John Travolta and later to star Leonardo DiCaprio. The project fell apart when an agreement could not be reached with the Sinatra estate.

Frankie Machine 
In the mid-2000s, after reading the novel The Winter of Frankie Machine by Don Winslow, Robert De Niro expressed interest in starring in a film adaptation. Scorsese considered taking on the project at one point, with Paramount Pictures CEO Brad Grey ready to green-light the film. However, Scorsese and De Niro decided they wanted to adapt I Heard You Paint Houses by Charles Brandt, a book De Niro came across while preparing for his role, into a film instead (which would later become The Irishman).

Roosevelt biopic 
In the early 2010s Scorsese started work on an adaptation of the biography The Rise of Theodore Roosevelt, to star Leonardo DiCaprio. The project eventually evolved into Roosevelt, abandoning the original book adaptation. The project was in development as late as 2017.

Clinton 
In 2012 Scorsese announced he was making a documentary on ex-U.S. president Bill Clinton. The film was partially shot, but was shelved at the beginning of 2015 when Clinton was said to have asked for too much creative control over how he was portrayed. Scorsese has said the film could still be made someday.

As producer

High and Low
In May 1993, it was reported that Scorsese was developing an American remake of the 1963 Akira Kurosawa film High and Low for Universal Pictures. In October 2008, it was reported that Mike Nichols was to direct the film with David Mamet serving as the screenwriter.  Scott Rudin was to have produced with Scorsese serving as an executive producer.

Joker
It was reported in the 2010s that Scorsese was to produce Joker (2019) with Leonardo DiCaprio playing the titular character.

Offers

The Godfather: Part II
Francis Ford Coppola suggested Scorsese to the executives at Paramount Pictures for directing The Godfather Part II (1974).

Beverly Hills Cop
Scorsese admitted he turned down the offer to direct Beverly Hills Cop (1984).

Witness
Scorsese also turned down the offer to direct Witness (1985).

Dick Tracy
Scorsese was approached to direct Dick Tracy (1990) before Warren Beatty wound up directing the film.

References

Scorsese, Martin
Martin Scorsese